The Condé Nast College of Fashion & Design is the first educational establishment of the Condé Nast Publications Ltd. set in the heart of London, UK.

Since opening its door in 2013 over 3000 students have graduated from the College and have gone on to work in some of the best known luxury brands such as: Chanel, Dior, Vogue, Hermes, Tom Ford, to name just a few.

History 
The Condé Nast College of Fashion and Design, established by Condé Nast Britain's Managing Director, Nicholas Coleridge, opened in April 2013.

The College 
The Condé Nast College of Fashion & Design provides students with a world-class fashion education in the heart of London.

Courses fuse exciting and intensive academic learning with fantastic access to the best and brightest minds in the industry, including the teams at Vogue, LOVE, Glamour, GQ and a host of other Condé Nast titles.

The College provides creative courses combined with a solid foundation in the business side of the industry. The purpose of our courses is to prepare students for a multitude of jobs: styling, journalism, fashion buying, marketing, branding, graphic design, PR, digital strategy, business, events, entrepreneurship, e-commerce and myriad other career paths into this exciting, fast-paced industry.

Through being part of one of the largest publishing houses in the world and with the support of the highly recognised academic institution of the University of Buckingham, the College is in the elevated position of being able to combine academic excellence with unrivalled links to the fashion and media industry. This creates a unique educational environment for students to thrive in."

The College is accredited by the University of Buckingham and Quality Assurance Agency for Higher Education (QAA).

The College delivers following courses:
Vogue Foundation Programme, 
BA (Hons) Fashion Communication & Industry Practice, 
MA Fashion Communication, 
MA Luxury Brand Strategy & Business, 
MA Entrepreneurship: Fashion & Creative Industries, 
MA Fashion Styling, 
MA Creative Direction for Fashion Media, 
MA Fashion Journalism & Editorial Direction
MA Fashion Media Strategy
MA Luxury Brand Management in partnership with Richmond University.

Short Courses:
Certificate in Fashion Media,
Certificate in Fashion Marketing, 
Certificate in Fashion Communication
Vogue Intensive Summer Course, 
5 Days of Fashion Journalism, 
5 Days of Fashion Business, 
5 Days of Fashion Styling, 
5 Days of Creative Direction, 
Vogue Teen Festival*only for 16–17 years old*

Insights Online 6-8 weeks Courses:  
Fashion Styling, 
Fashion Branding & Communication,
Creative Direction,
Digital Content Creation.

Our strong links with the industry allow us to not only help our students get their foot into the industry, but also bring some of the most achieved people in the industry into the classroom to share their expert knowledge and personal experience of the industry they are in.

Some of the guest speakers included: Edward Enninful OBE, editor-in-chief British Vogue and European editorial director of Condé Nast, Martina Fuchs, international TV Anchor, Business Journalist, Event Moderator, Expert on China and the Middle East, 
William Banks-Blaney, fashion expert;
Victoria Beckham, fashion designer;
Lucinda Chambers, fashion director of British Vogue;
Nicholas Coleridge, Managing Director of Condé Nast Britain and President of Condé Nast International;
Sarah Doukas, founder of Storm Model Management;
Jo Elvin, editor of Glamour magazine;
Henry Holland, fashion designer;
Tommy Hilfiger, fashion designer;
Anya Hindmarch, fashion accessories designer;
Caroline Issa, magazine publisher and consultant;
Dylan Jones, journalist, author and editor of British GQ;
Yasmin Le Bon, model;
Julien Macdonald, fashion designer;
Tamara Mellon, fashion designer and former chief creative officer of Jimmy Choo;
Suzy Menkes, journalist, fashion critic and Vogue International Editor;
Bertrand Michaud, Managing Director of Hermès UK;
Roland Mouret, fashion designer;
Kate Phelan, Creative Director of Topshop and Senior Contributing Fashion Editor at British Vogue;
Caroline Rush, Chief Executive of the British Fashion Council;
Alexandra Shulman, journalist, author and editor-in-chief of British Vogue;
Alice Temperley, fashion designer;
Matthew Williamson, fashion designer;

In 2013, the College was listed as number 53 in the PPA Magazine list of '100 Great Magazine Moments'.

Overseas 
Condé Nast International runs several ventures in education, including in Spain where the Vogue Masters in Communication, Fashion and Beauty is operated in conjunction with University Carlos III.

References 

Design schools
Higher education colleges in London
Educational institutions established in 2013
2013 establishments in England
Condé Nast